The 2013 Sana'a attack occurred on 5 December 2013 when a series of bomb and mass shooting gun attacks killed at least 56 people and wounded 162 at the Yemeni Defense Ministry in Sana'a, Yemen. Yemeni military investigators say 12 militants, mostly Saudi nationals, were responsible for the attack

Attack
Gunmen killed four guards surrounding the ministry compound. After the gate was open, a suicide bomber drove an explosive-laden car into the western entrance of the Defense Ministry complex. The suicide car bombing was followed by a coordinated attack by militants in another car. The gunmen entered the Al-Oradi Hospital inside the compound, shooting at those inside and killing many. At least six of the casualties were doctors and four were patients from a hospital within the complex. Another coordinated attack and gunfight outside the complex late afternoon was reported to have taken place.

Perpetrators
On 5 December, Ansar al-Sharia, a militant group linked to al-Qaeda has claimed responsibility for the attack.

Victims
The attacks claimed 56 lives and caused more than 200 injuries. Foreign medical workers were among the casualties. Among those who were killed were seven Filipino medical workers (including one doctor), two German aid workers, two Vietnamese doctors and one Indian nurse. Officials have said that all 12 militants which including Saudi Arabians were killed.

Aftermath

On 6 December, the U.S. military has increased its regional alert status following deadly, coordinated strikes on Yemen’s defense ministry that killed 57 and wounded 167 people on Thursday, a senior U.S. defense official said on Friday.
“The United States military is fully prepared to support our Yemeni partners in the wake of this incident,” the official told Reuters on condition of anonymity, and without offering further details.

The Philippines has banned deployment of migrant workers to Yemen in response to the attack which saw the deaths of seven Filipinos. The Philippine government will pay the expenses of Filipinos who wish to return to the Philippines.

Germany temporarily reduced its staff at its embassy in Sana'a and called for its aid workers in Yemen to leave the country "as quickly as possible",.

After footage of the attack was aired on Yemeni television, showing an attack on a hospital within the ministry compound and the killing of medical personal and patients, the head of al Qaeda in the Arabian Peninsula released a video message apologizing. Qassim al-Raimi claimed that the team of attackers were directed not to assault the hospital in the attack, but that one had gone ahead and done so.

See also
Al-Qaeda insurgency in Yemen
2012 Sana'a bombing

References

2013 murders in Yemen
Islamic terrorist incidents in 2013
Attacks in Asia in 2013
Mass murder in 2013
Terrorist incidents in Yemen in 2013
21st century in Sanaa
Suicide car and truck bombings in Yemen
Mass shootings in Yemen
Terrorist incidents attributed to al-Qaeda in the Arabian Peninsula
Filmed improvised explosive device bombings
Crime in Sanaa
December 2013 events in Yemen